The 1987–88 Seton Hall Pirates men's basketball team represented Seton Hall University during the 1987–88 NCAA men's college basketball season. The Pirates were led by sixth year head coach P.J. Carlesimo.

Roster

Schedule and results

|-
!colspan=12 style=| Regular Season

|-
!colspan=12 style=| Big East Tournament

|-
!colspan=12 style=| NCAA Tournament

Sources

Rankings

Awards and honors
P. J. Carlesimo – Big East Coach of the Year
Mark Bryant – Haggerty Award, First-team All-Big East

References

Seton Hall Pirates men's basketball seasons
Seton Hall
Seton Hall
Seton Hall
Seton Hall